The 3rd Missouri Cavalry Regiment was a cavalry regiment that served in the Union Army during the American Civil War principally in Missouri and Arkansas.

Timeline

The 3rd Missouri Cavalry Regiment was recruited and organized at Palmyra, Missouri, under the lead of John M. Glover. Recruitment commenced on June 1, 1861.
 December 1861: Began its duty in Southeast Missouri and District of Rolla. Began under command of General Benjamin Prentiss and Colonel John McNeil. Action near Hallsville, Missouri
 December 27, 1861: Battle of Mount Zion Church
 December 28, 1861: Inman's Hollow
 July 7, 1862: (Companies B, D, G, H). Mountain Store, Big Piney
 July 25-2~, 1862: (Companies E, F). Scout and skirmish in Sinking Creek
 August 4–11, 1862: (Detachment) Salem
 August 9, 1862: Wayman's Mills and Spring Creek
 August 23, 1862: Scout from Salem to Current River
 August 24–28, 1862: (Company E). Beaver Creek, Texas County
 November 24, 1862: Expedition from Rolla to Ozark Mountains
 November 30-December 6, 1862: (Companies A, B) Ozark
 December 2, 1862: (Companies A, B) Wood's Creek
 January 11, 1863: Harteville, Wood's Fork
 January 11, 1863: Batesville, Arkansas
 February 4, 1863: Operations against Marmaduke
 April 17-May 2, 1863: Castor River, near Bloomfield
 April 29, 1863: Bloomfield
 April 30, 1863: Coal Bluff, St. Francis River,
 April 30-May 1, 1863: Expedition against Little Rock, Arkansas
 July 1-September 10, 1863: Moved from Wittsburg to Clarendon
 August 1–8, 1863: Near Bayou Metoe
 August 26, 1863: Bayou Metoe (or Reed's Bridge)
 August 27, 1863: Advance on Little Rock
 September 1–10, 1863: Bayou Fourche and capture of Little Rock
 September 10, 1863: Brownsville
 September 16, 1863: At Jacksonport, Arkansas
 November 1863 to March 1864. Affair at Jackeonport
 November 21, 1863: (Company E). Reconnoissance from Little Rock
 December 5–13, 1863: Jacksonport
 December 23, 1863: Scouts from Brownsville
 January 17–19, 1864: Hot Springs
 February 4, 1864: Steele's Expedition to Camden
 March 23-May 3, 1864: Elkins' Ferry, Little Missouri River,
 April 3–4, 1864: Mark's Mills
 April 5, 1864: Little Missouri River
 April 6, 1864: Prairie D'Ann
 April 9–12, 1864: Camden
 April 15–24, 1864: Mt. Elba Ferry
 April 26, 1864: Princeton
 April 29, 1864: Operations against Shelby north of Arkansas River,
 May 18–31, 1864: At Little Rock till June, 1865. Benton Road, near Little Rock,
 July 19, 1864: Benton
 July 25, 1864: (Company C). Scatterville
 July 28, 1864: (Detachment). Expedition from Little Rock to Little Red River
 August 6–16, 1864: At Tannery, near Little Rock
 September 2, 1864: (Detachment). Expedition from Little Rock to Fort Smith
 September 25-October 13, 1864: (Detachment). Reconnaissance from Little Rock toward Monticello and Mt. Elba
 October 4–11, 1864: Reconnaissance from Little Rock to Princeton
 October 19–23, 1864: Princeton
 October 23, 1864: Expedition from Little Rock to Saline River
 November 17–18, 1864: (Detachment). Expedition from Little Rock to Benton
 November 27–30, 1864: (Detachment).
 Mustered out June 14, 1865: (Company "M" at Headquarters Department of Missouri, St. Louis, Missouri, November 1862 to June 1863.)

Casualties

The regiment lost 3 Officers and 37 Enlisted men killed or mortally wounded, 1 Officer and 172 Enlisted men killed by disease. In total, 213 men were killed over its duration of service.

Regimental Organization

Headquarters

The Commander of the Regiment was Colonel John Montgomery Glover from August 5, 1861, through March 13, 1864.

Company A

 Commander: Captain James Howland
 Executive Officer: 1st Lieutenant B. Triplett

Company B
This company was formed from Missouri men from Marion and Knox Counties.

 Commander: Captain John Yates
 Executive Officer: 2nd Lieutenant James J. Agnew

Company C
Company C was mostly Illinois men. Company C sustained a greater percentage of losses as compared to the other companies of the Regiment.

 Commander: Captain Thomas G. Black

Company D
Company D was composed of equal numbers of Missouri and Illinois men.

 Commander: Captain John H. Reed

Company E

 Commander: Captain George D. Bradway
 Executive Officer: 1st Lieutenant Joseph Biggerstaff
 2nd Lieutenant Nelson Young

Company F

 Commander: Captain James Call
 Executive Officer: 1st Lieutenant Francis Wilcox
 B Q Master: 1st Lieutenant James. C. Agnew

Company G

 Commander: Captain Willcox
 Executive Officer: 2nd Lieutenant George Felt

Company H

 Commander: Captain A. N. Graham
 Executive Officer: 1st Lieutenant S. Graham

Company I

 Commander: Captain John A. Lennon
 Executive Officer: 1st Lieutenant John Avery
 2nd Lieutenant Alexander Lacy

See also

 Missouri Civil War Union units
 Missouri in the Civil War

References

 Dyer, Frederick H. A Compendium of the War of the Rebellion (Des Moines, IA: Dyer Pub. Co.), 1908.
 Petty, A. W. M. A History of the Third Missouri Cavalry: From its Organization at Palmyra, Missouri, 1861 up to November sixth, 1864 (Little Rock: J. Wm. Demby), 1865.

Military units and formations established in 1861
Military units and formations disestablished in 1865
Units and formations of the Union Army from Missouri
1861 establishments in Missouri